The Day After Tomorrow is a 2004 American science fiction disaster film directed, produced, and co-written by Roland Emmerich. Based on the 1999 book The Coming Global Superstorm by Art Bell and Whitley Strieber, the film stars Dennis Quaid, Jake Gyllenhaal, Sela Ward, Emmy Rossum, and Ian Holm. It depicts catastrophic climatic effects following the disruption of the North Atlantic Ocean circulation. A series of extreme weather events usher in global cooling and lead to a new ice age.

Originally slated for release in the summer of 2003, The Day After Tomorrow premiered in Mexico City on May 17, 2004, and was released in the United States on May 28, 2004. A major commercial success, the film became the sixth-highest-grossing film of 2004. Filmed in Montreal, it was the highest-grossing Hollywood film made in Canada at the time of release. It received mixed reviews upon release, with critics highly praising the film's special effects but criticizing its writing and numerous scientific inaccuracies.

Plot
Jack Hall, an American paleoclimatologist, and his colleagues Frank and Jason, drill for ice-core samples in the Larsen Ice Shelf for the NOAA, when the ice shelf splits away. At a UN conference in New Delhi, Jack discusses his research showing that climate change could cause an ice age, but US Vice President Raymond Becker dismisses his concerns. Professor Terry Rapson, an oceanographer of the Hedland Centre in Scotland, befriends Jack over his views of an inevitable climate shift. When several buoys in the Atlantic Ocean show a severe temperature drop, Rapson concludes Jack's theories are correct. Jack's and Rapson's teams, along with NASA meteorologist Janet Tokada, build a forecast model based on Jack's research. Jack tries to get Becker to consider evacuations in the northern states, but Becker refuses.

A massive tropical depression develops in the northern hemisphere. This splits into three gigantic superstorms above Canada, Scotland, and Siberia, that siphon frozen air from the upper troposphere into their center, flash-freezing anything caught in their eyes with temperatures below . The storms' magnitude is severe enough that the Northern Hemisphere will enter a new ice age. Tokyo is struck by a giant hail storm, Los Angeles is devastated by a tornado outbreak, and three helicopters sent to rescue the British royal family from Balmoral Castle crash in Scotland after they fly into their superstorm's eye.

In New York City, Jack's son Sam, along with his friends Brian and Laura, participate in an academic decathlon, where they make a new friend, J.D. The North American superstorm creates strong winds and rain that flood Manhattan in knee-deep water. All transportation grinds to a halt, stranding the city population. A massive storm surge inundates the city, forcing Sam's group to seek shelter at the New York Public Library, but not before Laura accidentally cuts her leg. Sam is able to contact Jack and his mother Lucy, a physician, through a working payphone. Jack advises Sam to stay inside and warm, as the storm will only get worse, and promises to rescue him. Rapson and his team perish in the European storm. Lucy remains in a hospital caring for bed-ridden children, where she and her patients are eventually rescued by the authorities.

Upon Jack's suggestion, President Blake orders the southern states to be evacuated into Mexico, while the northern ones are warned by the government to seek shelter and stay warm. Jack, Jason, and Frank make their way to New York. In Pennsylvania, Frank falls through the skylight of a mall covered in snow and sacrifices himself by cutting his rope to prevent his friends from falling in with him.

In the library, most survivors decide to head south once the floodwater freezes, despite Sam's warnings. In Mexico, Becker is informed that Blake's motorcade got caught in the superstorm and all involved have perished. 
 
Laura develops blood poisoning from her injury, whereupon Sam, Brian, and J.D. scour a Russian cargo vessel that drifted into the city for penicillin, fending off a pack of escaped wolves from the Central Park Zoo, narrowly escaping back to the library as the eye of the North American superstorm passes over and freezes Manhattan. Jack and Jason take shelter in an abandoned restaurant.

Days later, the superstorms dissipate. After finding many people frozen to death, Jack and Jason reach the library, finding Sam's group alive. Jack sends a radio message to US forces in Mexico.

In his first address as the new president from the US embassy in Mexico, Becker apologizes on The Weather Channel for his ignorance and sends helicopters to rescue survivors in the northern states. Jack and Sam's group are picked up in Manhattan, where many people have survived. On the International Space Station, astronauts look down in awe at Earth's transformed surface, now with ice sheets extending across much of the Northern Hemisphere, remarking that the "air never looked so clear".

Cast

Production

Development
The Day After Tomorrow was inspired by Coast to Coast AM talk-radio host Art Bell and Whitley Strieber's book, The Coming Global Superstorm, and Strieber wrote the film's novelization. To choose a studio, writer Michael Wimer created an auction, with a copy of the script being sent to all major studios along with a term sheet. They had a 24-hour window to decide whether to produce the movie with Roland Emmerich directing, and Fox Studios was the only studio to accept the terms.

Filming
The Day After Tomorrow was filmed predominantly in Montreal and Toronto, with some footage also shot in New York City and Chiyoda, Tokyo. Filming ran from November 7, 2002, until October 18, 2003.

Special effects
The Day After Tomorrow features 416 visual effects shots, with nine effects houses, notably Industrial Light & Magic and Digital Domain, and over 1,000 artists, working on the film for over a year. Although a miniature set was initially considered according to the behind-the-scenes documentary, for the destruction of New York, effects artists instead utilized a 13-block-sized, LIDAR-scanned 3D model of Manhattan, with over 50,000 scanned photographs used for building textures. Due to its overall complexity and a tight schedule, the storm surge scene required as many as three special effects vendors for certain shots, with the digital water created by either Digital Domain or small effects house Tweak Films, depending on the shot.

Similarly, the opening flyover of Antarctica was also computer-generated, created by digitally scanning miniature iceberg models created out of sculpted styrofoam; the falling pieces of ice as the shelf cracks were entirely hand-animated. Created by the effects company Hydraulx, the scene is to date likely the longest all-CG shot in film history, surpassing the space zoom-out from the opening of Contact (1997).

Music
The score soundtrack for the film was composed by Harald Kloser and released by Varèse Sarabande and Fox Music.

Reception

Box office
The film came in second at the US box office behind Shrek 2 over its four-day Memorial Day opening and grossed $85,807,341.  It led the per-theater average, with a four-day average of $25,053 (compared to Shrek 2 four-day average of $22,633). 
At the end of its theatrical run, the film had grossed $186,740,799 domestically and $544,272,402 worldwide. It was the second-highest opening-weekend film not to lead at the box office; Inside Out surpassed it in June 2015.

Critical response
On Rotten Tomatoes, 45% of 220 critics gave the film a positive review, with an average rating of 5.30/10. The website's critics consensus reads: "The Day After Tomorrow is a ludicrous popcorn thriller filled with clunky dialogue, but spectacular visuals save it from being a total disaster." On Metacritic, the film has a weighted average score of 47 out of 100 based on 38 critics, indicating "mixed or average reviews". Audiences surveyed by CinemaScore gave the film an average grade "B" on an A+ to F scale.

Roger Ebert of the Chicago Sun-Times described the film as "profoundly silly", but nonetheless said the film was effective and praised the special effects. He gave it three stars out of four.

Accolades

Political and scientific criticism
Emmerich did not deny that his casting of a weak president and the resemblance of vice president Kenneth Welsh to Dick Cheney were intended to criticize the climate change policy of the George W. Bush administration. Responding to claims of insensitivity in his inclusion of scenes of a devastated New York City less than three years after the September 11 attacks, Emmerich said that it was necessary to showcase the increased unity of people in the face of disaster because of the attacks.

Some scientists criticized the film's scientific aspects. Paleoclimatologist and professor of earth and planetary science at Harvard University Daniel P. Schrag said, "On the one hand, I'm glad that there's a big-budget movie about something as critical as climate change. On the other, I'm concerned that people will see these over-the-top effects and think the whole thing is a joke ... We are indeed experimenting with the Earth in a way that hasn't been done for millions of years. But you're not going to see another ice age – at least not like that." J. Marshall Shepherd, a research meteorologist at the NASA Goddard Space Flight Center, expressed a similar sentiment: "I'm heartened that there's a movie addressing real climate issues. But as for the science of the movie, I'd give it a D minus or an F. And I'd be concerned if the movie was made to advance a political agenda." According to University of Victoria climatologist Andrew Weaver, "It's The Towering Inferno of climate science movies, but I'm not losing any sleep over a new ice age, because it's impossible."

Patrick J. Michaels, a former research professor of environmental science at the University of Virginia who rejected the scientific consensus on global warming,  called the film "propaganda" in a USA Today editorial: "As a scientist, I bristle when lies dressed up as 'science' are used to influence political discourse." College instructor and retired NASA Office of Inspector General senior special agent Joseph Gutheinz called The Day After Tomorrow "a cheap thrill ride, which many weak-minded people will jump on and stay on for the rest of their lives" in a Space Daily editorial.

Stefan Rahmstorf of the Potsdam Institute for Climate Impact Research, an expert on thermohaline circulation and its effect on climate, said after a talk with scriptwriter Jeffrey Nachmanoff at the film's Berlin preview:

Clearly this is a disaster movie and not a scientific documentary, [and] the film makers have taken a lot of artistic license. But the film presents an opportunity to explain that some of the basic background is right: humans are indeed increasingly changing the climate and this is quite a dangerous experiment, including some risk of abrupt and unforeseen changes ... Luckily it is extremely unlikely that we will see major ocean circulation changes in the next couple of decades (I'd be just as surprised as Jack Hall if they did occur); at least most scientists think this will only become a more serious risk towards the end of the century. And the consequences would certainly not be as dramatic as the 'superstorm' depicted in the movie. Nevertheless, a major change in ocean circulation is a risk with serious and partly unpredictable consequences, which we should avoid. And even without events like ocean circulation changes, climate change is serious enough to demand decisive action.

Environmental activist and Guardian columnist George Monbiot called The Day After Tomorrow "a great movie and lousy science".

In 2008, Yahoo! Movies listed The Day After Tomorrow as one of its top-10 scientifically inaccurate films. It was criticized for depicting meteorological phenomena as occurring over the course of hours, instead of decades or centuries. A 2015 Washington Post article reported on a paper published in Scientific Reports which indicated that global temperatures could drop relatively rapidly ( over an 11-year period)  due to a temporary shutdown of the Atlantic meridional overturning circulation caused by global warming.

Home media

The film was released on VHS and DVD by 20th Century Fox Home Entertainment on October 12, 2004, and was released in high-definition video on Blu-ray in North America on October 2, 2007, and in the United Kingdom on April 28, 2008, in 1080p with a lossless DTS-HD Master Audio track and few bonus features. DVD sales were $110 million, bringing the film's gross to $652,771,772.

See also

 Six Degrees: Our Future on a Hotter Planet – a 2007 non-fiction book
 The Coming Global Superstorm – a book on which the movie is based
 Fifty Degrees Below – a Kim Stanley Robinson novel in which greenhouse warming similarly disrupts the Gulf Stream
 Time of the Great Freeze – a novel by Robert Silverberg about a second Ice Age
 The World in Winter – a 1962 book by John Christopher about the beginning of a new ice age
 Geostorm – a 2017 film with a similar premise from Emmerich’s longtime collaborator Dean Devlin
 Ice – a 1998 film with a similar premise starring Grant Show, Udo Kier, and Eva La Rue
 Snowpiercer — a 2013 film about the remnants of humanity following a new global ice age
 Strange World — a 2022 animated film that stars Jake Gyllenhaal and Dennis Quaid in the same familiar dynamic their characters played as.
 Survival film

References

External links

 
 
 
 
 
 
 The Day After Tomorrow: A Scientific Critique

20th Century Fox films
2000s disaster films
2004 science fiction action films
2004 action thriller films
2000s American films
2000s English-language films
2004 films
American disaster films
American science fiction action films
American science fiction thriller films
Apocalyptic films
BAFTA winners (films)
Centropolis Entertainment films
Climate change films
Environmental films
Films about fictional presidents of the United States
Films about tornadoes
Films about tsunamis
Films based on non-fiction books
Films directed by Roland Emmerich
Films scored by Harald Kloser
Films set in 2004
Films set in libraries
Films set in Antarctica
Films set in Delhi
Films set in Los Angeles
Films set in Mexico
Films set in New York City
Films set in Scotland
Films set in the White House
Films set in Tokyo
Films set in Washington, D.C.
Films shot in Tokyo
Films shot in Montreal
Films shot in New York City
Films shot in Toronto
Flood films
Lionsgate films
United States presidential succession in fiction
Films about father–son relationships